Volgograd International Airport  is an airport located 15 km northwest of the city of Volgograd, formerly Stalingrad, in Russia. It comprises a civilian airport built on top of an older military runway (3300 m), now demolished. The terminal area parks 42 medium/large aircraft and 91 small aircraft.

A military training unit was present at Gumrak as late as 1994, the 706 UAP (706th Aviation Training Regiment), using Aero L-39 aircraft. However a more recent report puts 706 UAP at Beketovsk until 1997. Volgograd Airport served as base for Air Volga. When the airline went bankrupt in April 2010, its aircraft and most of the routes were taken over by RusLine.

In 2012 it was announced that Volgograd airport would have a new terminal and runway built which would bring the airport up to European standards, it is currently being built and will be complete sometime in 2017.

Battle of Stalingrad
The airport, then named Gumrak Airport, was used by the German 6th Army as fuel and supply depot (alongside with Pitomnik Airfield) during the Battle of Stalingrad in 1942–43. After the fall of Pitomnik on 17 January 1943, Gumrak was the only one of seven airfields around Stalingrad still in German hands. On 22 January, a last He 111 aircraft left the airfield with 19 wounded soldiers, the last flight out of Stalingrad for the 6th Army. Gumrak eventually was recaptured by the 293rd Rifle Division on 23 January, leaving the 6th Army without any means of direct support.

Airport expansion for FIFA-2018
 
In 2016, the new terminal of the airport was opened for international flights. Straight after opening, the first terminal building was demolished to give more space for a new terminal extension that is planned to be equipped with air-bridges. The construction is planned to finish before 9 May, where the terminal will open for passenger service and will integrate with terminal C. The current Soviet-built building (Terminal A) is planned to convert into a bus terminal.

On 8 May 2018, the new terminal B for domestic flights was opened for passengers. The new runway was also opened on that day. The last third stage of the airport re-construction will be integrating terminals B and C with the walking gallery and construction of air-bridges. The works will commence after FIFA-2018 finishes.

Airlines and destinations

Transportation

Bus
The current soviet-built terminal, after terminal B commences its operations in May, will be converted to the bus terminal. It was planned to do before FIFA World Cup 2018, but due to technical reasons, it will commence its services later.

Rail
The railway station is integrated with Terminal A, which in future plans to turn into bus terminal. The construction of the line was finished in April 2018, tested with the first train on 11 May and commenced the first journey on 17 May 2018. The train goes to Railway Terminal Volgograd-1 and the journey takes 30 minutes.

The train to and from Volgograd City Zone travels daily.

See also 
List of the busiest airports in the former USSR

References

External links

Russian Air Force bases
Soviet Air Force bases
Airports built in the Soviet Union
Airports in Volgograd Oblast
Airfields of the Battle of Stalingrad
Buildings and structures in Volgograd
Novaport